Parndana Conservation Park (formerly Parndana National Park) is a protected area in South Australia located on Kangaroo Island.  It was dedicated in 1968 for the protection of remnant native vegetation.

Description
The conservation park is classified as an IUCN Category III protected area.

Flora and fauna
Most of the area of the conservation park carries low open forest and shrubland featuring Eucalyptus baxteri and E. cosmophylla over Allocasuarina muelleriana, Banksia marginata, B. ornata, Xanthorrhoea tateana, Leptospermum myrsinoides and Hakea sp.  Some areas along drainage lines have an open forest or woodland of E. cladocalyx over Acacia paradoxa.  The conservation park provides feeding and nesting habitat for Glossy Black Cockatoos.

See also
 Protected areas of South Australia

References

External links
Parndana Conservation Park webpage on protected planet

Protected areas of Kangaroo Island
Conservation parks of South Australia
1968 establishments in Australia
Protected areas established in 1968